Michael Joseph Barry (1817 – 23 January 1889) was an Irish poet, author, and political figure.

Life and career

Born in Cork, Ireland, Barry was imprisoned in 1843 as a Young Irelander. That year an 1843 essay on repeal won the Repeal Association prize. He published his Kishoge Papers in Dublin University Magazine anonymously, later as "Bouillon de Garçon." He also published under the names "B.", "B.J.", "Beta", and "Brutus".

He recanted his early political views late in life and became a police magistrate in Dublin.

Works

Books included:
A Waterloo Commemoration
Echoes from Parnassus
Lays of the War
Six Songs of a Beranger
Heinrich and Leonore, an Alpine Story
Ireland, as She Was, as She Is, and as She Shall Be
Irish Emigration Considered
Songs of Ireland (editor with Thomas Osborne Davis)

References

1817 births
1889 deaths
19th-century Irish poets
Irish poets